Katey is a given name, a variant spelling of Katie and Katy. Notable people with the name include:

Katey Martin (born 1985), New Zealand cricketer
Katey Sagal (born 1954), American actress
Katey Stone (born 1966), American college ice hockey coach
Katey Walter, American earth scientist

Feminine given names
English feminine given names